The 127th New York State Legislature, consisting of the New York State Senate and the New York State Assembly, met from January 6 to April 15, 1904, during the fourth year of Benjamin B. Odell, Jr.'s governorship, in Albany.

Background
Under the provisions of the New York Constitution of 1894, 50 Senators and 150 assemblymen were elected in single-seat districts; senators for a two-year term, assemblymen for a one-year term. The senatorial districts were made up of entire counties, except New York County (twelve districts), Kings County (seven districts), Erie County (three districts) and Monroe County (two districts). The Assembly districts were made up of contiguous area, all within the same county, .

At this time there were two major political parties: the Republican Party and the Democratic Party. The Socialist Party, the Prohibition Party and the Socialist Labor Party also nominated tickets.

Elections
The New York state election, 1903, was held on November 3. The only statewide elective office up for election was a judgeship on the New York Court of Appeals. The incumbent Democrat Denis O'Brien was re-elected with Republican endorsement. The Socialist candidate received about 33,000 votes, the Prohibition candidate about 19,000.

Sessions
The Legislature met for the regular session at the State Capitol in Albany on January 6, 1904; and adjourned on April 15.

S. Frederick Nixon (R) was re-elected Speaker.

State Senate

Districts

Note: In 1897, New York County (the boroughs of Manhattan and Bronx), Kings County (the borough of Brooklyn), Richmond County (the borough of Staten Island) and the Western part of Queens County (the borough of Queens) were consolidated into the present-day City of New York. The Eastern part of Queens County (the non-consolidated part) was separated in 1899 as Nassau County. Parts of the 1st and 2nd Assembly districts of Westchester County were annexed by New York City in 1895, and became part of the Borough of the Bronx in 1898.

Members
The asterisk (*) denotes members of the previous Legislature who continued in office as members of this Legislature.

Employees
 Clerk: James S. Whipple
 Sergeant-at-Arms: Charles R. Hotaling
 Assistant Sergeant-at-Arms: F. H. Adams
 Doorkeeper: Christopher Warren
 Assistant Doorkeeper: Charles H. Barnard
 Stenographer: A. B. Sackett

State Assembly

Assemblymen

Employees
 Clerk: Archie E. Baxter
 Assistant Clerk: Ray B. Smith
 Sergeant-at-Arms: Frank W. Johnston
 Doorkeeper: Frank Sherer Jr.
 First Assistant Doorkeeper: Andrew Kehn
 Second Assistant Doorkeeper: D. Cameron Easton
 Stenographer: Henry C. Lammert

Notes

Sources
 Official New York from Cleveland to Hughes by Charles Elliott Fitch (Hurd Publishing Co., New York and Buffalo, 1911, Vol. IV; see pg. 348f for assemblymen; and 365 for senators)
 COUNT ON LEGISLATURE in NYT on November 5, 1903
 THE LEGISLATURE READY in NYT on January 6, 1904
 NIXON OPPOSES ODELL in NYT on January 7, 1904

127
1904 in New York (state)
1904 U.S. legislative sessions